Regina Lake Centre was a provincial electoral district for the Legislative Assembly of Saskatchewan, Canada from 1991 to 1995. It was created from territories from Regina Lakeview, Regina Centre and Regina South. While it existed, it was represented by NDP MLA Joanne Crofford. It was dissolved after the 1991 election, following a reduction in the amount of MLAs from 66 to 58. Its territory was divided between the ridings of Regina Lakeview, Regina Centre and Regina Northeast.

Election Result 

|-
 
| style="width: 130px" |NDP
|Joanne Crofford
|align="right"|6,286
|align="right"|62.77
|align="right"|–

 
|Prog. Conservative
|Bill Pratt
|align="right"|1,296
|align="right"|12.94
|align="right"|–
|- bgcolor="white"
!align="left" colspan=3|Total
!align="right"|10,014
!align="right"|100.00
!align="right"|

References 

Former provincial electoral districts of Saskatchewan